The Democratic Front for the Liberation of Togo (FDLT) was a clandestine opposition group in Togo. FDLT published Ablodé.

References

Defunct political parties in Togo